Mount Pleasant is a second-class township in Wayne County, Pennsylvania, United States. The township's population was 1,357 at the time of the 2010 United States Census.

Geography
According to the United States Census Bureau, the township has a total area of 57.6 square miles (149.2 km2), of which 56.5 square miles (146 km2)  is land and 1.1 square miles (3 km2)  (1.91%) is water.

Communities
The following villages are located in Mount Pleasant Township:
Belmont Corners (also called Belmont Corner or simply "Belmont")
Cascade
Niagara
Pleasant Mount
Rock Lake
Rudes Corners (also called Rudes Corner)
Whites Valley

Demographics

As of the census of 2010, there were 1,357 people, 565 households, and 383 families residing in the township.  The population density was 24 people per square mile (9.3/km2).  There were 831 housing units at an average density of 14.7/sq mi (5.7/km2).  The racial makeup of the township was 97.1% White, 0.7% African American, 0.2% American Indian, 0.9% Asian, 0.5% from other races, and 0.6% from two or more races. Hispanic or Latino of any race were 2.8% of the population.

There were 565 households, out of which 20.9% had children under the age of 18 living with them, 55.6% were married couples living together, 7.4% had a female householder with no husband present, and 32.2% were non-families. 26.4% of all households were made up of individuals, and 12% had someone living alone who was 65 years of age or older.  The average household size was 2.40 and the average family size was 2.91.

In the township the population was spread out, with 19.7% under the age of 18, 59.4% from 18 to 64, and 20.9% who were 65 years of age or older.  The median age was 48.6 years.

The median income for a household in the township was $53,424, and the median income for a family was $63,100. Males had a median income of $42,250 versus $29,038 for females. The per capita income for the township was $25,987.  About 1.5% of families and 1.8% of the population were below the poverty line, including 2.2% of those under age 18 and 1.7% of those age 65 or over.

Education
Forest City Regional School District is a Preschool-12th grade public school district serving residents of Mount Pleasant Township.

References

Townships in Wayne County, Pennsylvania
Townships in Pennsylvania